Oklahoma Christian University (OC) is a private Christian university in Oklahoma City, Oklahoma. It was founded in 1950 by members of the Churches of Christ.

History
Oklahoma Christian University, originally named Central Christian College, was founded in 1950 by members of the Churches of Christ. It opened as a two-year college with 97 students in Bartlesville on the  former estate of Henry Vernon Foster, a prominent oil businessman. L.R. Wilson, who founded Florida Christian College four years before, was the college's first president. Harold Fletcher, who became an OC emeritus professor of music, was the first faculty member hired for the new college. James O. Baird became the school's second president in 1954.

Soon after, plans were made to move the campus to Oklahoma City. Groundbreaking occurred on  the far north edge of Oklahoma City in 1957 and the university was relocated in 1958. It was renamed Oklahoma Christian College in 1959 and began offering bachelor's degrees, with its first senior class graduating in 1962. Full accreditation was obtained from the North Central Association of Colleges and Schools in 1965.

In the 1990s, the school restructured its academic departments into separate colleges and the name of the institution was changed initially to Oklahoma Christian University of Science and Arts in 1990, before being truncated to Oklahoma Christian University in 1996. In 1981, OC became the sponsor of The Christian Chronicle. In 2014, OC began their Ethos spiritual development program which encourages students to attend any of 26 small chapels.

Technology
In August 2001, OC provided campus-wide wireless Internet service and a personal laptop computer to every full-time student. In 2008, Oklahoma Christian University began providing Apple's MacBook to all full-time students and faculty, alongside the choice of an iPhone or an iPod Touch. Beginning with the fall 2010 semester, students also had the option of choosing an iPad for an additional charge. OC now provides information technology support for a "Bring Your Own Device" model. In 2013, OC's mobile computing program was honored as an Apple Distinguished Program.

Academics
All bachelor's degrees at OC require the completion of at least 126 semester hours. Not less than 30 hours must be earned in courses numbered 3000 or above, including at least 10 hours in the major field. Bachelor's degrees require completion of a core curriculum of 60 semester hours consisting of "basic skills" (14 hours), Bible (16 hours), "basic perspectives" (27 hours) and a 3-hour senior philosophy seminar

The university also offers an honors program; participants are selected by interview.

Through its Office of International Studies, OC offers semester-long study programs in Europe, based in the university's Das Millicanhaus in Vienna, Austria. OC also has shorter study abroad options in Asia and Honduras, plus additional options through the Council for Christian Colleges and Universities (CCCU).

Faculty
OC employs 94 full-time faculty members, more than 70 percent of whom hold a terminal degree in their respective fields. The undergraduate student-to-faculty ratio is 13-to-1. 83 percent of classes contain fewer than 30 students.

Presidents
 L. R. Wilson – 1950–1954
 James O. Baird – 1954–1974
 J. Terry Johnson – 1974–1996
 Kevin Jacobs – 1996–2001
 Alfred Branch – 2001–2002
 Mike O'Neal – 2002–2012
 John deSteiguer – 2012–present

Athletics

The Oklahoma Christian athletic teams are called the Eagles and Lady Eagles. The university is a member of the NCAA Division II ranks, primarily competing in the Lone Star Conference (LSC) since the 2019–20 academic year. They were also a member of the National Christian College Athletic Association (NCCAA), primarily competing as an independent in the Central Region of the Division I level from 2012–13 to 2018–19. The Eagles and Lady Eagles previously competed in the D-II Heartland Conference from 2012–13 to 2018–19; and in the Sooner Athletic Conference (SAC) of the National Association of Intercollegiate Athletics (NAIA) from 1978–79 to 2011–12; and in the Texoma Athletic Conference from 1973–74 to 1977–78.

OC competes in 15 intercollegiate varsity sports: men's sports include baseball, basketball, cross country, golf, soccer, swimming and track & field; while women's sports include basketball, cross country, golf, soccer, softball, swimming, track & field and volleyball. Club sports include men's and women's bowling, cheerleading, men's and women's disc golf, dance, esports and ultimate frisbee.

Campus

The campus contains more than 30 major buildings, with the majority built in an International and Mid-Century modern-influenced architectural style, with red brick and light-colored stone ornamentations.

The main entrance leads directly to the center of the campus. Located in this area is the Williams-Branch Center for Biblical Studies (1987), which contains Scott Chapel. Directly north of Scott Chapel is the Mabee Learning Center (1966), which houses the Tom & Ada Beam Library. Located between the Williams-Branch Center and the library's front entrance is the Thelma Gaylord Forum (1987), an amphitheatre.

East of the Mabee Learning Center are four of OC's earliest buildings, dating from 1959. Benson Hall is the main administrative building. Cogswell-Alexander Hall contains the registrar's office and information technology offices. Gaylord Hall is the site of the admissions and financial aid offices. Vose Hall contains science laboratories and classrooms. These buildings center around the university's original quadrangle.

North of the original quadrangle is the Davisson American Heritage (DAH) Building (1970). North of DAH is the Noble Science Wing (2011) and Herold Science Hall, site of OC's student undergraduate research program, and the Prince Engineering Center (1988).

Located east of the main entrance is the Baugh Auditorium, the main campus venue for performances and convocations. McIntosh Conservatory, an open meeting and performance space, links Baugh Auditorium with the Garvey Center (1978), consisting of Mabee Hall and Kresge Hall. Contained within this complex is Judd Theatre, designed for thrust or proscenium theatre productions, and Adams Recital Hall. East of Baugh Auditorium is the Harvey Business Center (1980).

The areas on the west side of the campus are largely devoted to student residences and recreation. The Gaylord University Center (1976/1997) contains the cafeteria, a snack bar, bookstore, health center, recreation areas and the Student Life and Student Government Association offices. North of the Gaylord University Center is the Payne Athletic Center (1970), site of a campus fitness facility, Olympic-size swimming pool, and the Eagles' Nest gymnasium. In 2007, The Oklahoman named the Eagles' Nest as one of the top-100 athletic venues in state history.

Some of the newest additions to the campus lie between these buildings and the dormitories to the west. Lawson Commons, an outdoor mall area, contains McGraw Pavilion, a covered outdoor event space, and the Freede Centennial Tower, a  clock tower that commemorates the 2007 Oklahoma state centennial. In October 2009, the campus received a gift of more than 1,300 trees in five varieties through a partnership between the Tree Bank Foundation and the Apache Foundation that were planted across the campus.

In 2013, OC opened the Boker-Wedel Eagle Trail, a 5 km path around the campus. The side-by-side asphalt and crushed granite running paths span a distance of 3.1 miles around the campus and have lighting, landscaping and security phones. The trail connects with the Edmond running trails system.

In April 2016, the university unveiled Hartman Place, a scripture garden and waterfall. Hartman Place contains a space designated for students to write, using chalk on slate, remembrances of loved ones they have lost.

OC provides almost 1,800 on-campus living spaces in 11 residence halls and nine apartment complexes. Dormitories are located on the western end of the campus. Apartment complexes, available to upperclass and married students, are located across Benson Road on the east end of campus

The northernmost portions of the campus contain outdoor venues for soccer, softball (Tom Heath Field at Lawson Plaza), track and field (Vaughn Track), baseball (Dobson Field) and intramural sports.

OC policies
OC maintains a commitment to traditional biblical principles as "derived from the Bible".

Attendance at OC is open to all students, regardless of religious affiliation, who agree to abide by OC's ideals. Full-time faculty and staff are required to be active members of a Church of Christ. Attendance at daily chapel services is mandatory for all full-time students. OC has an exemption from Title IX regulations prohibiting discrimination based on gender identity or sexual orientation.

Cascade College
OC operated Cascade College, a branch campus in Portland, Oregon, from 1994 until it closed in May 2009. Like OC, Cascade's full-time faculty and the majority of its students were members of Churches of Christ. In 1992, the Oklahoma Christian University Board of Trustees assumed the operation of the former Columbia Christian College after it suffered serious financial difficulties and lost accreditation. A year after Columbia closed, the new branch campus opened in 1994 as Cascade College. The North Central Association agreed that the accreditation of Oklahoma Christian, Oklahoma City, could extend to Cascade if close ties and supervision were maintained. In October 2008, the OC Board of Trustees announced that Cascade College would close after the spring 2009 semester. Bill Goad was the last president of Cascade and is now OC's executive vice president.

Notable alumni

Cliff Aldridge – former Republican member of the Oklahoma State Senate
 Jim Beaver – film and television actor, co-star of Deadwood and Supernatural
 Andrew K. Benton – seventh president of Pepperdine University
 Dan Branch (1980) – former member of the Texas House of Representatives from the Dallas area
 Sherri Coale (1987) – head coach, University of Oklahoma women's basketball
 Patrice Douglas (1983) – former member of the Oklahoma Corporation Commission
 Joe Clifford Faust (1980) – science fiction author and freelance writer
 Allison Garrett (1984), VP for academic affairs (2007–2012); current president at Emporia State University
 Rhein Gibson – professional golfer and Guinness World Record holder
 Roderick Green (2002) – paralympic athlete
 Molefi Kete Asante (under his birth name, Arthur Lee Smith, Jr.; 1964) – scholar of African studies and African American studies at Temple University; founder of the first Ph.D. program in African-American studies
 Greg Lee – actor, host of PBS series Where in the World is Carmen Sandiego? and voice of Mayor/Principal Bob White on Doug.
 Roy Ratcliff (1970) – Christian minister, ministered to Jeffrey Dahmer
 Tess Teague (2012) – former Oklahoma State Representative
 Sam Winterbotham (1999) – head coach, University of Tennessee men's tennis

References

External links
 
 Official athletics website

 
Universities and colleges in Oklahoma City
Universities and colleges affiliated with the Churches of Christ
Private universities and colleges in Oklahoma
Educational institutions established in 1950
1950 establishments in Oklahoma
Council for Christian Colleges and Universities